During the 1917–18 English football season, Brentford competed in the London Combination, due to the cessation of competitive football for the duration of the First World War. In a patchy season, the Bees finished in mid-table.

Season summary

The wartime London Combination was streamlined for the 1917–18 season, with the clubs voting to expel Portsmouth, Watford, Southampton and Luton Town, which would reduce travelling expenses on Britain's congested railways. Despite the entry of the United States into the First World War in April 1917, Britain was still mired in war and manager Fred Halliday again had trouble securing players to play. Of Brentford's squad, goalkeeper Ted Price, defenders Jack Peart, Dusty Rhodes and forwards Albert Chester, Patsy Hendren and Henry White would appear in the majority of the matches during the season. Half back Bill Stanton, previously with Watford, was a rare wartime signing and he too would be regularly available.

Manager Fred Halliday struggled to field a settled side during the opening months of the season and Brentford suffered six defeats in eight matches between mid-September and mid-November 1917. In late November, Halliday pulled off a transfer coup, re-signing former Brentford forward Jack Cock as a guest from Huddersfield Town, to whom he had transferred in April 1914. Cock went on to score 27 goals in 23 appearances, which included two hattricks and a five-goal haul versus rivals Queens Park Rangers on the final day of the season. Henry White, frequently Brentford's top scorer during the First World War, supported ably with 17 goals. The season was notable for some high scoring wins (4–0, 6–2, 6–1 versus Queens Park Rangers; 5–0 versus Clapton Orient and 5–2 versus Tottenham Hotspur) and crushing defeats (7–1 versus Millwall, 6–1 versus Tottenham Hotspur; 8–3, 7–3, 7–2 versus West Ham United and 4–0 on two occasions).

A number of former Brentford players were killed during the season:
 Private James Greechan, died of wounds suffered during the Battle of Langemarck on 25 August 1917, while serving with the Highland Light Infantry.
 Company Sergeant Major George Kennedy DCM MM, died of wounds suffered during the Battle of Passchendaele on 16 November 1917, while serving with the Canadian Infantry Corps.
 Private William Kirby, killed during the Battle of Passchendaele on 3 October 1917, while serving with the Royal Engineers. He had appeared as a guest during the 1916–17 season.
 Bombardier William Allwright, served with the Royal Field Artillery and died of a stroke in Britain on 12 April 1918, having returned to convalesce.
Private Harry Dutfield, served with the Leicestershire Regiment and was killed near Voormezeele, West Flanders on 6 June 1918.

League table

London Combination

Results
Brentford's goal tally listed first.

Legend

London Combination 

 Source: 100 Years Of Brentford

Playing squad 
Players' ages are as of the opening day of the 1917–18 season.

 Sources: 100 Years of Brentford, Timeless Bees, Football League Players' Records 1888 to 1939

Coaching staff

Statistics

Appearances and goals

Players listed in italics left the club mid-season.
Source: 100 Years of Brentford

Goalscorers 

Players listed in italics left the club mid-season.
Source: 100 Years of Brentford

Management

Summary

Transfers & loans 
Guest players' arrival and departure dates correspond to their first and last appearances of the season.

References 

Brentford F.C. seasons
Brentford